Live EMP Skychurch, Seattle, WA is the first (and only) live album by Hammerbox.

Track listing
  "Ask Why" – 4:05
  "Texas Ain't So Bad, Really" – 2:08
  "Hed" – 3:48
  "Starring Matter" – 2:35
  "Simple Passing" – 2:29
  "Bred" – 3:46
  "Their Given Voice" – 5:00
  "Under the Moon" – 4:30
  "No" – 4:03
  "Promise to Never" – 1:58
  "Size of the World" – 3:34
  "Blur" – 4:04
  "When 3 Is 2" – 6:57
  "Woke Up" – 5:05
  "Hole" – 2:57
  "Anywhere But Here" – 3:58

Hammerbox albums
2005 live albums
Live grunge albums